Soulboy (previously given the working title Souled Out) is a 2010 British film directed by Shimmy Marcus about 17-year-old Joe McCain (Martin Compston) coming of age in 1974 amidst the northern soul scene. The film was shot in Stoke on Trent following initial discussions with former Wigan Casino DJ Kev Roberts.

Plot
 
The film is set in Stoke-on-Trent in 1974. Joe McCain, 17 and restless, is bored with the flatline tedium of a life that seems like it's going nowhere, spending his Saturday nights in a dead pub called The Purple Onion and trying to rob the local fish and chip shop. However he then sees a beautiful woman in the street, and acting on impulse follows her into a record shop called Dee Dees Discs, where he finds out that one of her main interests is soul music and dancing at weekends at the Wigan Casino; the home of Northern Soul. He decides to go with his friend Russ on the coach that Saturday night, and starts to devote himself to learning how to fit in with the soul scene and become a Soul Boy, but there are complications on the way...

Cast
Martin Compston as Joe McCain
Felicity Jones as Mandy Hodgson
Alfie Allen as Russ Mountjoy
Nichola Burley as Jane Rogers
Craig Parkinson as Alan
Brian McCardie as Fish Shop Bobby
Jo Hartley as Monica
Pat Shortt as Brendan
Huey Morgan as Dee Dee
Bruce Jones as Wigan Casino bouncer
George Oliver as Speedy Guy
Barbara Lynn Teague as Uncredited extra
Olivia Roberts as Uncredited extra

Soundtrack
Paul Weller, Feeder, Duffy and The Dap-Kings worked on the soundtrack to the film.

References

External links
 
 

2010 films
British coming-of-age films
2010s English-language films
Stoke-on-Trent
2010s British films